Affirmation is a composition by José Feliciano, written in 1975 and first released on his album Just Wanna Rock 'n' Roll the same year. It was made popular by jazz guitarist George Benson on his 1976 album Breezin'. It was one of Benson's greatest hits and it is regarded as a jazz standard.

References

1975 songs
1970s jazz standards
José Feliciano songs
George Benson songs
Smooth jazz songs

Jazz compositions in B minor
Smooth jazz